Operation Ranger was the fourth American nuclear test series. It was conducted in 1951 and was the first series to be carried out at the Nevada Test Site.
All the bombs were dropped by B-50D bombers and exploded in the open air over Frenchman Flat (Area 5).

These tests centered on the practicality of developing a second generation of nuclear weapons using smaller amounts of valuable nuclear materials. They were planned under the name Operation Faust.

The exact locations of the tests are unknown, as they were all air drops.

References

External links

 

Explosions in 1951
Ranger
1951 in military history
1951 in Nevada
1951 in the environment
January 1951 events in the United States
February 1951 events in the United States